John Fenn may refer to:

John Fenn (antiquarian) (1739–1794), English antiquarian who edited and published the Paston Letters
John Fenn (chemist) (1917–2010), American co-recipient of the Nobel Prize in Chemistry in 2002
John Fenn (pirate) (died 1723), English pirate
John Fenn (priest) (died 1615), English Roman Catholic priest and writer